Mount Dendi is a volcano located near the city of Addis Ababa, in Ethiopia.
It fully contains Lake Dendi. It is the second highest volcano in Ethiopia, only  from Wonchi, Ethiopia's highest volcano.

References

Dendi